Tino Weber (born 12 February 1970) is a former backstroke swimmer from Germany

He was born in Merseburg, Sachsen-Anhalt, and competed for his native country at the  1992 Summer Olympics in Barcelona, Spain. A member of Sportverein Halle, he won a silver medal at the 1993 European Sprint Swimming Championships in Gateshead.

References
 sports-reference

1970 births
Living people
People from Merseburg
German male swimmers
Olympic swimmers of Germany
Male backstroke swimmers
Swimmers at the 1992 Summer Olympics
European Aquatics Championships medalists in swimming
Sportspeople from Saxony-Anhalt